Burin is a Palestinian village in the Nablus Governorate of the State of Palestine, in the northern West Bank, located  southwest of Nablus. The town had a population of around 2,800 in 2008.

History
The name itself may conserve the toponym of Beera mentioned in the Book of Judges 9:21.

In the 12th and 13th centuries, during the Crusader era, Burin was inhabited by Muslims, according to the historian Diya al-Din al-Maqdisi. In 1176, a part of the tithes from the village was pledged to the Church of Mount Zion, but there is no evidence that it was ever collected. 

The founder of the Banu Ghawanima family, Shaykh Ghanim, was born in the village in 1166 and entered Jerusalem with the army of Saladin in 1187. He was appointed as the sheikh of the city's al-Khanqah al-Salahiyya Mosque founded by Saladin in 1187 and he and his descendants served as the head judges of the Shafi'i fiqh (Islamic school of law) in Jerusalem. The Ghawanima Minaret (commons) and Bab al-Ghawanima gate (commons) of the  Haram esh-Sharif were both named after the family.

Ottoman era
Burin was incorporated into the Ottoman Empire in 1517 with all of Palestine, and in 1596 it appeared in the tax registers as being in the nahiya of Jabal Qubal, part of the Nablus Sanjak. It had a population of 120 households and 5 bachelors, all Muslim. They paid a fixed tax rate of 33.3% on a number of crops, including wheat, barley, summer crops, olives, and goats or beehives, and a press for olives or grapes; a total of 26,445 akçe. The family of the Damascene scholar al-Hasan al-Burini (d. 1615) hailed from Burin.

In 1838, it was noted as Baurin, located in Jurat Amra, south of Nablus. Robinson further noted that it was "a large village, or rather a market town." In 1882, the PEF's Survey of Western Palestine described Burin  as a "large village in a valley, with a spring in  the middle and a few olives."

British Mandate era
In the 1922 census of Palestine conducted by the British Mandate authorities, Burin had a population of 901, all Muslims, while in the 1931 census it had 215 houses and a population of 859 Muslims.

In the 1945 statistics, Burin (with Iraq Burin) had a population of 1,200, all Muslims, with 19,096 dunams of land, according to an official land and population survey. Of this, 1,797 dunams were plantations and irrigable land, 8,741 used for cereals, while 106 dunams were built-up (urban) land.

Jordanian era
In the wake of the 1948 Arab–Israeli War, and after the 1949 Armistice Agreements, Burin came under Jordanian rule.

The Jordanian census of 1961 found 2,068 inhabitants in Burin.

Post-1967
Since the Six-Day War in 1967, Burin has been under Israeli occupation.

After the 1995 accords, 20% of the village land was classified as Area B, the remaining 80% as Area C. Israel has confiscated land from Burin in order to construct 2 Israeli settlements: 621 dunams for Bracha, and 233 dunams for Yizhar.

Demographics
In the 1997 census by the Palestinian Central Bureau of Statistics (PCBS), Burin had a population of  1,915. Palestinian refugees and their descendants accounted for 57.1% of the inhabitants. According to the PCBS, the town had a population of 2,573 inhabitants in mid-year 2006. The town had a population of around 2,800 in 2008.

Expropriation and settler violence

The land and water resources of Burin has gradually been reduced since the 1967 Israeli occupation, due to the expropriation for Israeli settlements and military bases. Since 1982, more than 2,000 dunams of Burins land was first declared "state land" and then handed over to the settlers of Har Brakha.

In 2008, a yeshiva student from Yitzhar was arrested after a failed rocket attack on Burin. After Israeli police demolished a trailer home in Adei Ad, a group of settlers from Yitzhar vandalized cars,  smashed windows and cut electricity wires in Burin. From mid-June 2008 to August 2008 the human rights group Yesh Din documented nine attacks on Palestinian families living in Burin allegedly carried out by settlers living in outposts near Yitzhar or Har Brakha. Cases of "disturbances of the peace", a term referring to harm caused to Palestinians and their property, as well as harm to Israeli security forces, by Israeli citizens, rose in 2008, with 429 incidents in the first half of 2008, compared with 587 incidents in all of 2006 and 551 in 2007.

In February 2010, an 18-year-old Palestinian from Burin was shot and wounded by a settler security guard, which the settlers said took place after Palestinians threw stones at them.

There has been several attacks from Israeli settlers in Burin. Olive harvest days are coordinated with Israel, the Palestinian Authority and large clans in the area to prevent violence and vandalism. 7,714 Palestinian-owned trees were damaged during the first months of 2013. According to a report by Yesh Din, Burin had lost the most trees. A spokesman for the Israeli governing body in the West Bank said that were also cases where Palestinians has damaged trees owned by Israel, but they were fewer.

In 2019, Jewish settlers physically assaulted Israeli human rights activists in Burin. The human rights activists had arrived at the village to assist Palestinian farmers to harvest their olive trees and were attacked by masked assailants with iron rods and hurled stones. Three days later, another incident took place in Burin as masked settlers again promoted a stone attack against Palestinian farmers on Palestinian agricultural land near Burin; two Palestinians were harmed and taken to a hospital in Nablus, and none of the settlers were arrested.

In 2022, Israeli human rights activists were again attacked by Jewish settlers near Burin, where the activists had come to help Palestinian farmers plant trees in areas that had been damaged or vandalized in previous attacks. Seven of the Israeli activists were wounded by the settlers in the attack, which was labeled by the Israeli public security Minister as "terrorism".

References

Bibliography

External links
 Welcome To Burin
Survey of Western Palestine, Map 11:   IAA, Wikimedia commons 
 Burin Council
Burin Village Profile,  Applied Research Institute–Jerusalem (ARIJ)
 Burin (aerial photo), ARIJ
 Development Priorities and Needs in Burin, ARIJ
 Burin olive orchards under settlers' attack 29, December, 2005, POICA
  Confiscation of more Palestinian Lands in Burin village for the expansion of Bracha Settlement 01, May, 2009, POICA
  Setting 1200 Olive Trees Alight in Burin village – Nablus Governorate 17, July, 2011, POICA
Ravaging 17 Olive Trees in Khallet Siwar, Burin Village - Nablus Governorate 11, May, 2012, POICA
 Burin
 Burin

Nablus Governorate
Villages in the West Bank
Municipalities of the State of Palestine